Loud House, The Loud House (or any similar variants) may refer to:

The Loud House, American animated TV series
JMA Wireless Dome, sports venue nicknamed "Loud House"
Loudhouse, American Band